The Tour de Mumbai (also known as Mumbai Cyclothon) was an annual professional road bicycle racing classic one-day race held in Maharashtra, India, named after Mumbai. It is classified by the International Cycling Union (UCI) as a 1.1 category race as part of the UCI Asia Tour.

Past winners

Mumbai Cyclothon
 2010:

Mumbai Cyclothon I
 2011:

Mumbai Cyclothon II
 2011:

External links
 http://tourdemumbai.in/(2010) 
 http://tourdeindia.asia/ (all events)

Mumbai Cyclothon I
 
 Mumbai Cyclothon 2010 at cyclingnews.com
 Statistics at the-sports.org
 Mumbai Cyclothon at cqranking.com

Mumbai Cyclothon II
 
 Mumbai Cyclothon 2011 at bsahercules.com
 Statistics at the-sports.org
 Mumbai Cyclothon II at cqranking.com

Cycle races in India
UCI Asia Tour races
Recurring sporting events established in 2010
2010 establishments in Maharashtra
Sport in Mumbai